Rice and curry is a popular dish in Sri Lanka, as well as in the Indian subcontinent.

Rice and curry dinner comprises the following:

 A large bowl of rice, most often boiled, but frequently fried. Sometimes kiribath, rice cooked in coconut milk, is served.
 A vegetable curry, perhaps of green beans, jackfruit or leeks.
 A curry of meat, most often chicken or fish but occasionally goat or lamb
 Dhal, a dish of spiced lentils.
 Papadums, a thin crisp wafer made from legume or rice flour and served as a side dish.
 Sambals, which are fresh chutney side dishes; they may include red onion, chili, grated coconut, lime juice, and are often the hottest part of the meal.

Each bowl contains small portions, but as is traditional in most tropical Asia, if a bowl is emptied, it is immediately refilled.

The curry uses chili peppers, cardamom, cumin, coriander and other spices. It has a distinctive taste. The Southern cuisines use ingredients like dried fish which are local to the area. The spicier preparations are believed to be among the world's hottest in terms of chili content (second only to Sylheti). While natives are born into this cuisine and develop a tolerance to spicy food, many visitors and tourists to the country often find the spiciness excessive. As a result, many local restaurants in developed and tourist areas offer special low-spice versions of local foods to cater to foreign palates or have an alternative "western" menu for visitors and tourists.

See also
 Appam
 Adobo
 Curry
 Japanese curry
 List of fried rice dishes
 Nasi kari

References

 Seriouseats.com: An Introduction to Sri Lankan Cuisine

Pakistani cuisine
South Indian cuisine
Sri Lankan rice dishes
Indian rice dishes
South Asian curries
Bangladeshi cuisine
Curry dishes